The 3 arrondissements of the Corrèze department are:
 Arrondissement of Brive-la-Gaillarde, (subprefecture: Brive-la-Gaillarde) with 96 communes. The population of the arrondissement was 128,863 in 2016.  
 Arrondissement of Tulle, (prefecture of the Corrèze department: Tulle) with 104 communes. The population of the arrondissement was 70,741 in 2016.  
 Arrondissement of Ussel, (subprefecture: Ussel) with 80 communes.  The population of the arrondissement was 41,931 in 2016.

History

In 1800 the arrondissements of Tulle, Brive and Ussel were established. The arrondissement of Ussel was disbanded in 1926, and restored in 1943. 

The borders of the arrondissements of Corrèze were modified in January 2017:
 three communes from the arrondissement of Brive-la-Gaillarde to the arrondissement of Tulle
 two communes from the arrondissement of Tulle to the arrondissement of Brive-la-Gaillarde
 19 communes from the arrondissement of Tulle to the arrondissement of Ussel
 eight communes from the arrondissement of Ussel to the arrondissement of Tulle

References

Correze